The 2020–21 season was the 112th season in the existence of Borussia Dortmund and the club's 45th consecutive season in the top flight of German football. In addition to the domestic league, Borussia Dortmund participated in this season's editions of the DFB-Pokal, the DFL-Supercup, and the UEFA Champions League. The season covered the period from 1 July 2020 to 30 June 2021.

Players

First-team squad

Out on loan

Transfers

In

Out

Kits

Goalkeeper

Pre-season and friendlies

Competitions

Overview

Bundesliga

League table

Results summary

Results by round

Matches
The league fixtures were announced on 7 August 2020.

DFB-Pokal

DFL-Supercup

UEFA Champions League

Group stage

The group stage draw was held on 1 October 2020.

Knockout phase

Round of 16
The draw for the round of 16 was held on 14 December 2020.

Quarter-finals
The draw for the quarter-finals was held on 19 March 2021.

Statistics

Appearances and goals

|-
! colspan=16 style=background:#dcdcdc; text-align:center| Goalkeepers

|-
! colspan=16 style=background:#dcdcdc; text-align:center| Defenders

|-
! colspan=16 style=background:#dcdcdc; text-align:center| Midfielders

|-
! colspan=16 style=background:#dcdcdc; text-align:center| Forwards

|-
! colspan=16 style=background:#dcdcdc; text-align:center| Players transferred out during the season

Goalscorers

Last updated: 22 May 2021

Notes

References

External links

Borussia Dortmund seasons
Borussia Dortmund
Borussia Dortmund